The fifth competition weekend of the 2018–19 ISU Speed Skating World Cup was held at the Vikingskipet in Hamar, Norway, from Friday, 1 February, until Sunday, 3 February 2019.

Schedule
The detailed event schedule:

Medal summary

Men's events

Women's events

Standings
Standings after completion of the event.

Men

500 m

1000 m

1500 m

Long distance

Mass start

Team pursuit

Team sprint

Women

500 m

1000 m

1500 m

Long distance

Mass start

Team pursuit

Team sprint

References

5
ISU World Cup, 2018-19, 5
2019 in Norwegian sport
Sport in Hamar
ISU Speed Skating